Kiowa Roukema (born 3 December 1999), professionally known as YoungKio, is a Dutch record producer and songwriter. He is best known for producing "Old Town Road", by American rapper Lil Nas X in 2019. Since the rise in popularity of "Old Town Road", YoungKio signed to Victor Victor Worldwide, Universal Music Publishing Group and French record producer CashMoneyAP's record label and production collective Cash Gang. He is of Surinamese descent.

Career
YoungKio first started producing beats in 2016. He began producing on the popular digital audio workstation FL Studio, which his friend gifted to him. YoungKio's early and current influences include producers Wheezy and TM88. He later stated, "In my opinion, I became good at it pretty fast." He began posting his type beats on YouTube and sold leases for $30. With this money, he saved up to purchase a year-long membership to the beat store hosting platform BeatStars.

In 2018, one of YoungKio's beats was leased by American rapper Lil Nas X for his song "Old Town Road". The beat sampled the 2008 Nine Inch Nails song "Ghost IV – 34". The song was released independently on December 3, 2018, and gained popularity on social video sharing app TikTok. Since the rise in popularity of "Old Town Road", YoungKio has done interviews with Forbes, GQ, and many other publications. He has also flown to Los Angeles to work with producers like CashMoneyAP, and appeared in the "Old Town Road" music video. He has since been hired to produce beats for prominent artists like Lil Pump and Rico Nasty.

Production discography

Charted singles 

Notes

References

1999 births
Living people
Dutch record producers
Dutch people of Surinamese descent
21st-century male musicians